Karel Brückner (born 13 November 1939, Olomouc) is a Czech retired football coach.

Playing career
Brückner played as a forward in the lower leagues for MŽ Olomouc, at levels between the Regional Championship and the Second League. He made two appearances for Baník Ostrava in the Czechoslovak First League during the 1970–71 season.

Coaching career
Brückner began his coaching career in 1973 with his home club SK Sigma Olomouc, before moving to FC Zbrojovka Brno, who he led in the Czechoslovak First League in the 1981–82 and 1982–83 seasons. He later went on to coach Inter Bratislava with which he won the Slovakia Cup in 1985.

He was appointed coach of the Czech Republic national under-21 football team in 1997 and the side finished second at the 2000 UEFA European Under-21 Championship. At UEFA Euro 2000 he was assistant manager of the Czech Republic national side.

Brückner became the national team manager in 2001, following the Czech Republic's unsuccessful qualifying campaign for the 2002 FIFA World Cup. In the time up to March 2004, the Czech Republic played twenty matches without defeat under his leadership, winning seven of eight qualifying matches for the Euro 2004 tournament and drawing the other one. In the tournament's group match against the Netherlands, the Czech Republic conceded two goals within the first 20 minutes. Although Jan Koller scored a goal to make the score 2–1, Brückner responded by taking the unusual step of making a tactical substitution during the first half of the match, sending on midfielder Vladimír Šmicer to replace defender Zdeněk Grygera after just 25 minutes. The Czech Republic scored twice more, with Šmicer scoring the winner two minutes before the end, as Brückner's team completed a comeback. The team went on to reach the semi-finals of UEFA Euro 2004.

The team qualified for the 2006 FIFA World Cup but did not progress past the group stage. Brückner extended his contract for a further two-year period after the competition. The Czech Republic qualified for Euro 2008. Prior to the tournament, Brückner announced his intention to leave his position at the end of the competition. The Czech Republic failed to progress beyond the group stage of the tournament. 

In spite of announcing his retirement, Brückner did not remain unemployed for long. In July 2008, the national team of Austria named him as their new manager.
On 2 March 2009, the Austrian Football Association announced that Brückner had left his position as Austria's coach by mutual consent after having led the team to just one win in seven matches. On 8 July 2009, Bruckner was named Advisor to Ivan Hašek of the Football Association of the Czech Republic.

Honours
Inter Bratislava
 Slovak Cup: 1994–95

References

1939 births
Sportspeople from Olomouc
Living people
Czech footballers
Czechoslovak footballers
Czech people of German descent
Association football forwards
SK Sigma Olomouc players
FC Baník Ostrava players
Czech football managers
Czechoslovak football managers
FK Inter Bratislava managers
MŠK Žilina managers
SK Sigma Olomouc managers
FC Zbrojovka Brno managers
UEFA Euro 2004 managers
2006 FIFA World Cup managers
UEFA Euro 2008 managers
Czech Republic national football team managers
Austria national football team managers
Expatriate football managers in Austria
Expatriate football managers in Slovakia
Czech expatriate sportspeople in Austria
Czech expatriate sportspeople in Slovakia
FK Vítkovice managers
Recipients of Medal of Merit (Czech Republic)
Czech expatriate football managers